Maticora River is a river of northern Venezuela. It flows into the Caribbean Sea.

See also
List of rivers of Venezuela

References
Rand McNally, The New International Atlas, 1993.

Rivers of Venezuela